Secale vavilovii  is a species of grass (family Poaceae), native to Turkey, the Transcaucasus, Iraq, and Iran. An annual, it is a crop wild relative of rye (Secale cereale) and is being studied for its resistance to Fusarium ear blight and Septoria leaf blotch.

References

Rye
Flora of Turkey
Flora of the Transcaucasus
Flora of Iraq
Flora of Iran
Plants described in 1924